Most Serbian words are of native Slavic lexical stock, tracing back to the Proto-Slavic language. There are many loanwords from different languages, reflecting cultural interaction throughout history. Notable loanwords were borrowed from Greek, Latin, Italian, Persian, Turkish, Hungarian, Russian, English and German.

Overview
It is estimated that there are 900–1,200 Greek, 88–188 German,  and an uncertain high number of Turkish and Persian loanwords in modern Serbian.

History

Proto-Slavic

Ancient Greek words in Proto-Slavic are identified through phonetic features, some related to Greek phonetic history, others possibly Scythian-Sarmatian or Gothic mediations. Ancient Greek, non-mediated words are korablja (ark), koliba (cottage, hut), and supposedly trem (porch); Scythian mediations are luk (onion), haluga (fence), koš (basket), talog (dregs), kurva (whore, slut, skank, hooker); supposedly Gothic mediations are crkva (church) and daska (plank). There exists loanwords in Proto-Slavic from non-Indo-European languages. Among Uralic and Turkic lexemes, estimated to have been adopted between the 3rd and 7th century, surviving into modern Serbian are čaša (cup, mug, glass), knjiga (book), kovčeg (chest), krčag (pitcher), sablja (sabre). Adoptions from Avaric in the 6th–7th centuries are the titles ban and župan, and klobuk (a type of hat). South Slavic was also influenced by Bulgar since their arrival in the eastern Balkans in the 7th century, e.g. beleg (landmark), beočug (shackle), bubreg (kidney), pašenog (co-brother-in-law), tojaga (bludgeon).

Old Serbian
The South Slavic languages were greatly influenced by Greek beginning in the Early Middle Ages, through translation of Byzantine works, leaving religious, philosophical and psychological terms. Late medieval speech had very few loanwords, rather replacing Greek words with calques for linguistical purity. German linguist Vasmer (1944) recorded 1,000 Greek words in Serbian, most of which were addressed in the Old Serbian form. Today, it is estimated that 900–1,200 Grecisms (grecizmi) exist in Serbian, more than 400 being in the church-religious section. In the economical section, apart from Greek, many words in Old Serbian were Romance. In mining, the majority of words were Germanic, arriving with Saxons.

Modern history
The Ottoman conquest began a linguistical contact between Ottoman Turkish and South Slavic; Ottoman Turkish influence grew stronger after the 15th century. Besides Turkish loanwords, also many Arabic (such as alat, "tool", sat, "hour, clock") and Persian (čarape, "socks", šećer, "sugar") words entered via Turkish, called "Orientalisms" (orijentalizmi). Also, many Greek words entered via Turkish. Words for hitherto unknown sciences, businesses, industries, technologies and professions were brought by the Ottoman Empire. Christian villagers brought urban vocabulary from their travels to Islamic culture cities. Many Turkish loanwords are no longer considered loanwords.

In the 19th and early 20th century Serbian, unlike the Croatian, version of the Serbo-Croat language continuum was much more open to internationalisms (words from Latin and Classical Greek) used in sciences and arts (cf. Serbian istorija vs. Croatian povijest = history and such).

Contemporary situation
English influence is seen in recent times, with the common suffixes -er and -ing. Examples are kasting, ketering, konsalting, listing, džoging, šoping, etc. Foreign loanwords are becoming more frequent in sports terminology.

Comparison with other Serbo-Croatian variants
The differences between Serbian and Croatian is mainly reflected in loanwords. Bosnian has the most Ottoman Turkish loanwords of all Serbo-Croatian variants.

Purism

Serbo-Croatian vocabulary is of mixed origin, with words borrowed from Greek, Latin, Italian, Turkish, Hungarian, and more recently Russian, Czech and German. Most loanwords have entered Serbian without resistance, while on the other hand in Croatian, linguistic purism was adopted as a policy during Austria-Hungary (against presumed Germanization) and later in Yugoslavia (against presumed Serbian domination). In Croatia, the term "Serbisms" is used for characteristically Serbian words, unwanted during World War II and the Yugoslav wars, many of which have been replaced by neologisms.

Examples

alas, "river fisherman", from Hungarian halász
alat, "tools", from Arabic آلة 

ašov, "shovel, spade", from Hungarian ásó
avlija, "yard", from Greek 
badem, "almond", from Persian bādām 
baksuz, "bad luck", from Turkish
bakšiš, "tip", from Turkish
barut, "gunpowder", from Turkish
biber, "pepper", from Greek 
bitanga, "bastard, rascal, rogue, scum", from Hungarian bitang
brak, "marriage", from Russian
bubreg, "kidney", from Turkish böbrek
budala, "fool", from Turkish
bunar, "water well", from Turkish
bunda, "fur coat", from Hungarian
burazer, "bro", from Turkish 
burma, "wedding ring", from Turkish
bre, interjection, from Turkish or Greek
čaj, "tea", from Persian or Turkish çay
čak, "even" , "albeit", from Turkish
čamac, "small boat", from Turkish
ćao, greeting, from Italian ciao
časopis, "magazine", from Czech
čarapa, "socks", from Arabic جوراب 
čaršav, "sheet", from Persian chādorshab 
ćelav, "bald", from Turkish kel
ćevapi, a grilled meat dish similar to sausages, from Turkish kebab
čelik, "steel", from Turkish çelik
cipele, "shoes", from Hungarian cipellő
čizme, "boots", from Turkish çizme
čoban, "shepherd", from Turkish çoban
ćorav, "blind, near sighted", from Turkish kör
čorba, "soup", from Turkish çorba
crkva, "church", from Greek kyriakón
čudovište, "monster", from Russian
ćufta, "meatball", from Persian kufteh 
ćuprija, "bridge", from Greek géfyra  köpru 
cvekla, "beet", from Greek
daska, "plank", from Greek
drum, "road", from Greek drómos
đak, "student, pupil", from Greek diákos
đakon, "deacon", from Greek diákonos
đubre, "garbage, trash, rubbish", from Greek kópros 
dugme, "button", from Turkish
dušek, "mattress", from Turkish
duvan, "tobacco", from Persian dokhān 
džep, "pocket", from Arabic جَيْب 
džigerica, "beef", from Persian jegar 
episkop, "bishop", from Greek épískopos
guma, "rubber", from Greek kómmi
hartija, "paper", from Greek chartí
hiljada, "a thousand", from Greek khiliás
jeftin, "inexpensive, cheap", from Greek
jok, "no", from Ottoman Turkish yok 
kada, "bathtub", from Greek kádos
kamata, "interest", from Greek kámatos
karanfil, "carnation", from Greek 
kasarna, "barracks", from French caserne
kesa, "bag, sack", from Persian kiseh 
kesten, "chestnut", from Greek kástana 
klisura, "gorge", from Greek kleisoúra
kobila, "mare, female horse", from unknown, cf. Latin caballus horsekoliba, "cottage", from Greekkočija, "carriage, chariot", from Hungarian kocsi koljivo, "wheat", from Greekkomad, "piece, parcel", from Greek kommátionkorablja, "ark", from Greekkoš, "basket", from Greekkravata, "necktie", from French cravatekrevet, "bed", from Greek kreváti kruna, "crown", from Latin coronakum, "godfather", from Latin comparekutija, "box", from Greek koutílapsus, "lapse, mistake in a speech", from Latinličnost, "individual, personality", from Russianlivada, "meadow, field of flowers", from Greek livádilopov, "thief", from Hungarian lopóluk, "onion", from Ancient Greekmajmun, "monkey", from Arabicمايمون  majstor, "master, repairman", from German meistermiris, "smell, aroma, odour", from Greek mýronnafta, "petroleum", from Greek náphthanagrada, "reward, prize", from Russiannana, "mint", from Persian na'nā narandža, "orange", from Persian nāranj pantalone, "trousers, pants", from Italianpapuče, "slippers", from Persian pāpush pasoš, "passport", from Hungarian passzus patos, "floor", from Greek pátospeškir, "towel", from Turkishpiljan, "godson", from Latin filianus pita, "pie", from Greek pítapodrum, "basement", from Turkishpop, "priest", from Greek papásputir, "chalice", from Greek potḗrrovit, "weak, liquid, fluid", from Greekrajsferšlus, "zipper", from Germansanduk, "chest", from Arabic صندوق šator, "tent", from Persian chādor šećer, "sugar", from Persian shekar šnajder, "tailor", from Germanšnicla, "steak", from Germanšrafciger, "screwdriver", from Germanštrudla, "strudel" (a type of pie), from Germansidro, "anchor", from Greek sídirossimpatičan, "nice", from Italian simpaticosirće, "vinegar", from Persian serkeh šnajper, "marksman shooter", from English (US) snipersoba, "room", from Hungarian szobasomun, "bread, loaf, bun", from Greek stanovništvo, "population", from Czechsunđer, "sponge", from Greek talas, "wind or sea wave", from Greek thálassatiganj, "pan, skillet", from Greek tigánitop, "cannon" from Turkishtrpeza, "dining table", from Greek usled, "due to", from Russianvaroš, "town, borough", from Hungarian város''

See also
 Arabic-Persian-Greek-Serbian Conversation Textbook

References

Sources

Further reading

Serbian language
Serbian words and phrases
History of the Serbo-Croatian language
Serbian